Brian William Kent-Smith (born 10 October 1935) is a British middle-distance runner. He competed in the men's 1500 metres at the 1960 Summer Olympics.

References

1935 births
Living people
Athletes (track and field) at the 1960 Summer Olympics
British male middle-distance runners
Olympic athletes of Great Britain
Sportspeople from Barnstaple